Charlotte Schneider is a fictional character from the German soap opera Verbotene Liebe, portrayed by actress Gabriele Metzger. She made her first appearance on screen in the series premiere on 2 January 1995. After the departure of Konrad Krauss, who played Arno Brandner, Metzger is the only remaining original cast member.

Creation

Introduction
Charlie is introduced as a secondary character and best friend of Clarissa von Anstetten, played by Isa Jank. She is rarely seen in the beginning and then only as sidekick of Clarissa. She is the one to whom Clarissa can talk and the only one with whom Clarissa is really honest about everything. Charlie doesn't judge her no matter what and even supports Clarissa with her lies and schemes. It's also revealed that Charlie has a thing for younger men when she leaves a party of the Anstetten family in the company of a man, saying to Clarissa that she has plans with him for the night. The character of Charlie Schneider is also an adaption of the character on Sons & Daughters named Charlie Barlett, played by Sarah Kemp. The original and the adaption share a similar minor role during the show's early months, before they both emerge as key characters.

Personality
Charlie is a dizzy socialite in the beginning that loves it to gossip about everything and everyone. She has a taste for younger men, even though she wants something more in life. With time, we find Charlie often as the tragicomic character of the show. While she entertains us with her love to gossip and some embarrassing situations, Charlie is also a character that has tragic moments when it comes to her relationship. Her belief in love and the desire for something more puts her in relationships with lousy men, who hurt her sooner or later. Even though she supports Clarissa's schemes in the beginning, Charlie later becomes a very warm and hearty person. She is also a very forgiving woman, which can also be her biggest weakness.

Development
Upon her arrival, Charlie was quickly established as gossip factory, a characteristic she keeps through to the years. But Charlie is also a character that goes through changes in her personality. Always shown on-screen and mentioned, she deals with her past and the person she has become now. While she is Clarissa's "partner in crime" in the beginning of the show, she develops as a participant, before Charlie becomes a good soul that helps others. But that her past can never be rewritten is shown when her niece Olivia, played by Kristina Dörfer, arrives in 2006 and blackmails her aunt with one of her old mistakes. In scenes with Olivia we see more of Charlie's old self. When the secret [that she paid the ex-girlfriend of her younger brother to get an abortion] comes out, she later forgives Olivia for her blackmail and leaves her old self once again in the past.

Love in Charlie's life
In the beginning, Charlie is shown as a woman who loves to have affairs with younger men. With time, Charlie tries for something more; she wants to find love and even a husband. She fails miserably a few times. Most of the men seem to fall in love with Charlie's wealth instead with her. Others betray Charlie, like David McNeal, played by Sam Eisenstein, who cheated on her with Tanja von Anstetten, played by Miriam Lahnstein. She invested too much time in her relationship with Johannes von Lahnstein, played by Thomas Gumpert, when he wasn't ready for a new love in his life. As time goes by, Charlie tries to give up on love. But then Bernd von Beyenbach, played by Ron Holzschuh, seems to have true feelings for her. At first he is only after her money, but honestly begins to fall for her. But when Bernd cheats on her with Olivia, she breaks up with him. Bernd hopes for her forgiveness - with success. Charlie tries to speak with him before Bernd leaves town, but by then he is already gone. After this heartbreak, Charlie is once again shown as a woman who loves uncomplicated affairs, however long they last. With this side of Charlie, the viewers see parts of her old self in her again. When Sascha Göbel, played by Tobias Fries, is introduced, Charlie gets involved with him, yet another younger man. But Sascha wants to get serious with Charlie and has genuine feelings for her. Charlie doesn't trust men anymore and she dumps him, not believing that it could work out. Even though she ended it, Charlie is left heartbroken once again. Then the character takes a drastic turn, when Stella Mann, played by Anne Wis, is introduced and shows interest in Charlie. This begins the build up to a lesbian relationship between Stella and Carla von Lahnstein, played by Claudia Hiersche, that gets more serious with time. This is a plot line of which many viewers disapprove, showing Charlie as a woman with a depressing past with men that is pushed into a potential love affair with another woman.

Friendships
Since the beginning of the show, Charlie always has had a friend on the show and, now that she is a key character, is a friend also to a group of characters. Charlie's best friend was the devious Clarissa for the first years. Even though Clarissa betrayed Charlie a couple of times, the two remained as friends until Clarissa's exit in 2001. The friendship between the two woman was very unequal. While Clarissa was scheming, Charlie became a good person. And even in the beginning, Charlie was portrayed as little bit dumb and quirky, while Clarissa seemed intelligent and elegant. Over the years Charlie changed and has proven that she has become an intelligent businesswoman. After Clarissa's exit, Charlie's stupidity was gone too. Cécile de Maron, played by Yvonne Burbach, becomes Charlie's new best friend. Charlie develops as good soul and loyal friend to Cécile and also to Clarissa's stepson Henning, last played by Patrick Fichte. She is shown as someone who likes to play amour and a very good listener. Charlie also becomes friends with other characters, most notable Arno Brandner, played by Konrad Krauss and Elisabeth von Lahnstein, played by Martina Servatius. In 2008, Charlie becomes friends with Nathalie von Lahnstein, played by Jenny Winkler, a woman that had committed a hit and run by Charlie. Also involved in this was her friend Elisabeth, who kept Nathalie's crime as a secret. Charlie forgives both of them, which once again shows the mentioned weakness in her personality.

Storylines
In the beginning, Charlie owns a gallery and enjoys a luxurious lifestyle. She likes young men and has zippy attitude. For many years she is the best friend of Clarissa von Anstetten and supports her schemes, but changes her character later to the better and becomes a good soul. The friendship lasted to Clarissa's presumed death in 2001. After she decides to take a break from art and closes her gallery, she opens her own bistro - the Schneiders, which becomes a popular meeting place for the high society of Düsseldorf. Charlie thinks she only needs a man in her life to complete her happiness. But she always seems to meet the wrong guys. Most of them use Charlie because of her wealthy lifestyle and she is left heartbroken many times.

Charlie begins an affair with David McNeal and falls in love with him. They get into a relationship, but when Charlie's worst enemy, Tanja von Anstetten, who was supposed to be dead, returns, and wants to get back at Charlie. She threatens her with her life and begins an affair with David. Tanja makes sure Charlie finds out about it and Charlie catches David with Tanja in bed. Charlie breaks up with him, but Tanja isn't finished with her old "friend" - she wants to drive Charlie crazy. And her plans work, as not even her brother Lars (Herbert Ulrich) eventually believes or trusts her anymore. Charlie engages a professional murderer who should kill Tanja. But she already knows about Charlie's plan and blackmails her. Charlie has to give her all of her possessions and Charlie ends up working at the No Limits.

But Charlie wins everything back, reopens the Schneiders and is very happy when her nephew Oliver Sabel comes back to town from working as a steward on cruise ships for a few years. He finds out Charlie hasn't the best relationship with Olivia and he wants to change that. He finds out that Olivia slept with Charlie's fiancé Bernd von Beyenbach. But when Olivia tells him that she regrets that, Oliver wants to help make peace between them. But what Oliver doesn't know is that Olivia is blackmailing her aunt about a secret from her past. Then Charlie finds out that Olivia faked a pregnancy and made Andi Fritzsche and Ansgar von Lahnstein each believe they are the father of the baby. Olivia warns Charlie not to tell anyone about that. But she can't shut her mouth and gives Andi a hint. When Olivia finds out that Charlie is partially responsible for Andi leaving her, she wants to get back at her.  Olivia tells everyone that Charlie paid Lars' ex-girlfriend to have an abortion years ago. Lars breaks ties with his sister and Charlie is left heartbroken. Oliver tries to help his aunt and sets up a big family reunion. Lars forgives his sister for the mistake she made years ago and Charlie is even willing to forgive Olivia. Since then, Charlie has a good relationship with Olivia and again with her brother Lars.

In fall of 2008, Charlie starts dating again. She meets the young and attractive Sascha Göbel in a gallery, which she visits with her good friend Elisabeth. Charlie tries to take things slowly and doesn't want to rush in anything because of her history with men. But Sascha really seems like a nice guy and Oliver and Olivia seem to like him too. But when Charlie sees Sascha with Olivia, old memories come back to her mind and she thinks about how her relationship with Bernd turned out. Charlie gets a little paranoid and assumes that Sascha is flirting with Olivia. He isn't and tells Charlie that he wants her and even confesses his love to her. But this is too much for Charlie and she tells him she isn't ready to say it back to him yet. Sascha is okay with it, but things get more complicated when he becomes more and more an important part in Charlie's life. Thinking that she isn't ready for a serious relationship, she ends things with Sascha.

Single again, Charlie enjoys her life and is invited to a masked ball at Castle Königsbrunn. Set up to dance with Eduard von Tepp, she soon needs to see that he is a boring character. When Eduard wants to have another dance with Charlie, Stella Mann rescues her. Charlie thanks Stella and has a nice chat with her before she decides to leave the ball. But her driver is already gone. Stella offers her to take her home. The two ladies end up in the Schneiders, have another glass of champagne and dance together. Charlie and Stella end up kissing each other and Stella develops feelings for Charlie. Stella wants to form a serious relationship and even though Charlie is attracted to Stella, she tells her that just can't have a romantic relationship with another woman.

In 2011, Charlie discovers that Clarissa is alive and spent the last ten years in prison. As Clarissa believes that Tanja died all those years ago, Charlie is determined to keep it that way. Clarissa wants to have a new start with her children in Spain. But it doesn't take long that Clarissa discovers Tanja and has to find out that she now is the head of her company Ligne Clarisse Lahnstein. Charlie tries to keep Clarissa from getting back to her old self but soon realizes that Clarissa never changed as she has been lying to her daughter Julia for months. Charlie is shocked when Clarissa returns to Germany and is causing a public scandal as she appears alive and well on the fashion show of Ligne CL's controversial line "Mother of Incest" - a line Tanja named after her old enemy. As Clarissa tries to get in good graces of the Lahnstein family, Charlie supports Elisabeth as Clarissa tries to cause trouble in Elisabeth's marriage with Ludwig von Lahnstein. In the beginning of 2012, Charlie and Frank Helmke, a police inspector, have started seeing each other.

In late 2012, Charlie tries to stop Arno, who is suffering from Alzheimer and about to die, from writing a letter to Oliver revealing that Oliver has a half-sister, born to his father on an affair. After Arno's death, Charlie goes on a trip to clear off her head, and in the meantime Oliver finds the letter and later discovers that Clarissa arranged the adoption of a baby that might be his sister. Clarissa provides him enough information to track her to the city of Tübingen. When Charlie returns, she discovers that Olli found his sister, Bella Jacob. Later, she confesses to be Bella's mother.

Notes

Verbotene Liebe characters
Fictional businesspeople
Television characters introduced in 1995
Fictional socialites